Moxastine (also known as mephenhydramine) is an antihistamine and anticholinergic.

It was developed in Czechoslovakia and sold in hydrochloride form as an antihistamine (Alfadryl).

It is, with 8-chlorotheophylline, a component of cocrystal/salt moxastine teoclate (mephenhydrinate) used as antiemetic (Theadryl; Kinedryl (with caffeine)).

References

See also 
 Diphenhydramine

Diphenhydramines
H1 receptor antagonists